Philip Eliasoph (born 1951) is an American art historian, critic and curator. Eliasoph began his teaching career in 1975 at Fairfield University where he is currently Professor of Art History in the Department of Visual & Performing Arts. He is also the Sam & Bettie Roberts Endowed Lecturer in Judaic Studies at the university's Carl and Dorothy Bennett Center for Judaic Studies, a position he has held since 2005. In 1996, Eliasoph founded, and remains director and moderator, of the “Open VISIONS Forum,” a public affairs series held at Fairfield University's Regina A. Quick Center for the Arts. Since 2016, Eliasoph has also been a faculty consultant for The New York Times digital inEducation blog, a global higher education platform.

Early life and education 
Eliasoph attended public school in Great Neck, New York. His interest in the fine arts was ignited by his paternal grandmother, artist and poet  Paula Eliasoph (1895-1983). He completed a dual studio art/art history degree and graduated summa cum laude from Adelphi College in 1971.  Upon graduation, he was awarded a full teaching fellowship at the Binghamton University. In 1974, Eliasoph completed his MA thesis on avant-garde Soviet architecture analyzing architectural renderings by Konstantin Melnikov. Four years later, Eliasoph won the Distinguished Dissertation Award in the Humanities for his study: Paul Cadmus: Life and Work which was based, in part, on extensive interviews Eliasoph conducted with Cadmus at the artist’s Brooklyn Heights and Weston, CT studio/residences.

Published work 
As an art historian, Eliasoph has focused on WPA-era urban and social realists as well as artists in the Magical Realism school, including:  Paul Cadmus, Robert Vickrey, Stevan Dohanos, Colleen Browning, Robert Bizinsky, Henry Koerner and Adolf Dehn. He is the author of over 250 art reviews in regional media, and of numerous books, including:
Adolf Dehn: Midcentury Manhattan, Artist Book Foundation, North Adams, Mass; October, 2017, 
Robert C. Jackson: Paintings, Schiffer Publishers, 2012, 
Colleen Browning: The Enchantment of Realism, Hudson Hills Press, NY, 2011, 
Robert Vickery: The Magic of Realism, Hudson Hills Press, New York, 2009, 
Paul Cadmus: Yesterday & Today, Miami University Art Museum, Oxford, Ohio, 1981,

References

American art historians
Living people
1951 births
Binghamton University faculty